The Austin Maestro is a five-door hatchback small family car (and two-door van derivative) that was produced from 1982 to 1987 by British Leyland, and from 1988 until 1994 by Rover Group, as a replacement for the Morris Marina and Austin Allegro. The car was produced at Morris' former Oxford plant, also known as Cowley, with 605,000 units sold. Today, the redeveloped factory builds the BMW Mini. An MG-branded performance version was sold as the MG Maestro from 1983 until 1991.

Although later models were sometimes referred to as the Rover Maestro, the model never wore the Rover badge. The Austin Montego saloon was a variant of the Maestro.

Background

British Leyland was created in 1975 when the bankrupt British Leyland Motor Corporation was nationalised. In 1977 the South African-born corporate troubleshooter, Michael Edwardes, was recruited as chairman to sort out the troubled firm. Part of Edwardes' plan was to introduce a completely new range of mass-market models to replace the current offerings, designed and built using state-of-the-art technology. The new range eventually decided upon consisted of a new vehicle for each of the small, lower-medium and upper-medium market segments. The first of these cars to be launched was the Austin Metro in 1980.

Design and development
The new cars for the lower and upper medium segments were to share a platform, with various trim and styling differences to distinguish the two different models. The two models would in effect replace four existing vehicles in the British Leyland range – the Maestro would simultaneously replace both the Austin Allegro and Maxi, whilst the Montego replaced the Austin Ambassador and Morris Ital, these latter two having been recent facelifts of the Princess and Morris Marina. Since all but the Allegro were made at the Cowley plant, this rationalization would give the cost benefits of production automation and flexibility. This common platform was given the project name LC10, using the Leyland Cars project sequence (LC8 became the Austin Mini Metro on its launch in 1980, LC9 became the Triumph Acclaim when it was launched in 1981). Preliminary design work for LC10 began in 1977, with production scheduled to begin around 1980 – which would have seen it go on sale around the same time as the Ford Escort MK3 and the original Vauxhall Astra.

LC10 was styled by Ian Beech under the direction of BL designer David Bache. Two main body variations were provided: a five-door hatchback and a four-door notchback. It was a departure from previous front-wheel drive cars from the company in dispensing with the famous Issigonis transmission-in-sump powertrain that had been pioneered in the Mini. Coupled to the A- and R-series powerplants was an end-on transmission (as pioneered by Fiat with the Autobianchi Primula), bought from Volkswagen. The sophisticated Hydragas suspension system used on previous BL models was sacrificed on cost grounds, with a conventional MacPherson strut system at the front and a Volkswagen Golf-style torsion beam at the rear being used instead – but with long travel rising rate springs. While easier to build, this suspension did compromise load space. Prototypes were even tested with actual Golf suspension components. This may have led to the early cars being prone to front wheel bearing issues. The Maestro was larger and heavier than the first VW Golf.

It was decided that the five-door hatchback version would be engineered first. It was given its own project designation, LM10, with this version to be launched as the Austin Maestro. The name "Maestro" had been a finalist when the Austin Metro was being named, with the third choice ("Match") never picked up. The booted notchback version was to follow and it was designated as LM11, although its development was to diverge from the original path, it was later launched as the Austin Montego on its launch in April 1984, following British Leyland's decision to discontinue the Morris marque.

Production began in November 1982, and the car was officially launched on 1 March 1983.

Novel features
The Maestro incorporated many novel and pioneering features for its class. It had a bonded laminated windscreen, homofocal headlamps, body-coloured plastic bumpers, an electronic engine management system, adjustable front seat belt upper anchorage positions, an asymmetrically split rear seat, and a  service interval. The MG and Vanden Plas versions had solid-state instrumentation with digital speedometer and vacuum fluorescent analogue displays for tachometer, fuel and temperature gauges, trip computer and a voice synthesis warning and information system. The analogue instrument pod fitted to lower models was later used in the Range Rover from 1985 onwards.

Reception

The Maestro was launched in March 1983. In its summing up of the new car the Consumers' Association, in the June edition of its Which? journal, described it as roomy, comfortable, and nice to drive, and said "If you are considering buying one now, our advice, based on our first impressions, is to go ahead". In January 1984, after testing the car, they concluded: "In comparison with opposition of a similar price and body size, the Maestro has a clear advantage on room for passengers, with few cars equalling it for comfort either in the front or back". They also considered it to be a serious rival to the higher-segment Vauxhall Cavalier and Ford Sierra, apart from its smaller boot space.

The original lineup consisted of the 1.3-litre base, L, and HLE models, the 1.6-litre L, HLS, and Vanden Plas, and the sporty MG Maestro. The HLE model had a somewhat downtuned engine and received Volkswagen's "monstrously long-geared" 3+E transmission to maximize fuel economy, at the cost of severe performance loss. To further up the HLE's economy game, it was fitted with an econometer and the same black rubber fins along the sides of the rear windshield as was the MG Maestro. The base model forwent the other versions' plastic bumpers, instead being fitted with black-painted steel units. The plastic bumpers were the first of their kind, being made from polybutylene terephthalate (PBT), allowing them to be painted and then oven cured at the same high temperature as the car's steel body. The 1.6 HLS and Vanden Plas received a 4+E gearbox (a five-speed with a particularly long top gear), while the MG's closer ratio five-speed box derived from that of the Golf GTi. A trip computer with a voice synthesizer was standard on the MG and Vanden Plas models, with the Vanden Plas also benefitting from bronze-tinted windows, power locks, and power windows for the front doors.

Later developments
The car was a reasonable success, but not as much as beleaguered BL had hoped. It was Britain's sixth best selling car in 1983 and 1984, with more than 80,000 sales in its second year. After the "boom" years of 1986 and 1987, Maestro sales went into decline. An early reputation for poor build quality and unreliability did not help. The biggest problems centred around the 1.6-litre R-series engine, which was a hurriedly modified BMC E-series engine from the Austin Maxi because the under-developed S-series unit was not yet ready for production. R-series units suffered from hot starting problems and premature crankshaft failure. This was particularly evident in the MG Maestro 1600, which was included in the original 1983 model range but discontinued the following year.

The new S-series engine eventually appeared in July 1984, and was fitted to all existing 1.6-litre Maestros. The new S-series engine also came fitted with electronic ignition. At the same time, some minor equipment upgrades were made across the range. The 1.3-litre base model gained head restraints, a passenger door mirror and a radio. The 1.3-litre HLE, 1.6-litre automatic and 1.6 HLS all gained a radio-cassette player.

In October 1984, there were more equipment upgrades made across the range. The 1.3 base models gained reclining front seats, door bins, locking fuel filler caps and clocks. The L models gained cloth door trim, upgraded upholstery, and remote-adjustable driver's side door mirrors; the 1.6 Ls gained five-speed gearboxes. The 1.3 HLEs gained five-speed "4+E" gearboxes with overdrive fifth gear ratios, side mouldings, tweed cloth upholstery and  remotely adjustable passenger's side door mirrors. The HLS and 1.6 automatics gained tinted glass, central locking, electric front windows, velour upholstery and upgraded radio-cassette players. The MG Maestros gained electronic fuel-injected  versions of the 2-litre O-series engine, uprated suspension and ventilated front disc brakes, colour-keyed exterior trim, tinted glass, central locking and leather-trimmed steering wheels. The new MG Maestro offered much better performance and refinement than its predecessor.

Also in October 1984, the existing Maestro line-up was joined by the 1.3 HL and 1.6 HL. These models fitted between the L and HLE models.

August 1985 saw the arrival of the 1.3 City and 1.3 City X. The 1.3 City was similar to the previous 1.3 base model. The 1.3 City X added full carpeting, cloth upholstery, head restraints, a rear parcel shelf, a radio and a manually operated choke. These models also did without the plastic bumpers, having more conventional steel bumpers with plastic end caps similar to the Maestro van.

The original dashboard was of a multi-piece construction, and gained a reputation for being flimsy and prone to squeaks and rattles, so in February 1986, this was replaced with the more conventional dashboard from the Montego and in the change the voice synthesis unit (prone to reliability issues) was dropped. At the same time more minor equipment upgrades were made across the range. The City X gained door bins and rear wash-wipe. The L and LE gained tweed trim. The HL and automatic gained velour trim and additional brightwork. The Vanden Plas gained leather trim and uprated electronic stereo system.

BL was sold to British Aerospace in 1988, when the Austin badges were discontinued. The range was sustained by the noisy but economical direct injection naturally aspirated Perkins diesel unit launched the previous year. However, without a turbo this model was rather slow. The diesel had already been available in the Maestro van since 1986.

The MG Maestro Turbo, fitted with a turbocharged version of the 2.0 fuel-injected engine from the MG Maestro EFi, was unveiled at the Motor Show in October 1988 and went on sale on 17 March 1989.

After the launch of the new Rover 200 in October 1989, the Maestro was repositioned as a budget entry level model, with only the base specification models remaining in production while the MG variants were discontinued in 1991. Production had peaked at more than 101,000 units in 1983, and as late as 1989 nearly 60,000 were made. Most sales were in the United Kingdom, where it peaked as the sixth best selling car with more than 80,000 sales in 1984, but by 1989 sales had halved and it was the 19th best seller.

However, production figures fell to 38,762 for 1990, more than halving the following year to 18,450. 1991 was also the year that the MG-badged versions finished production, their place effectively being filled in the Rover range by faster versions of the 200-series hatchback.

The turbo improved refinement, as well as performance, at no cost to fuel economy. It was very competitively priced, it was about the same price as the Rover Metro and Peugeot 205 non-turbo diesel superminis that were a size smaller. The only other engine option was the elderly 1.3-litre A series.

In 1993, What Car? buyers' guide section said: "Yes, its old, but nowadays it's also very cheap. Popularity of noisy but economical and surprisingly rapid turbodiesel is what keeps this roomy car going."

Also in 1993, the Automobile Association road tested the turbo diesel. Their verdict: "You're hardly likely to buy a Maestro diesel to improve your street cred! For turning heads, the 218/418 diesel is a much better proposition. However, disinterested passengers love the back seat, while the driver can relish the model's marked reluctance to visit filling stations. Here's a hatchback for buyers who are really serious about the substance rather than the image – and with a price tag that's thousands of pounds lower than most of its rivals (shown in our comparison chart), you start saving even before your first forecourt stop. Unless you're averse to gearchanging, this unpretentious Maestro turbo-diesel, at its competitive price, can't seriously be faulted."

In 1993, however, production fell to just over 7,000 units and in its final year, 1994, just over 4,000 were produced, the last one rolling off the production line in December. The chassis development for the Maestro and Montego's rear suspension was used as a basis for later Rover cars, and was well regarded.

In 1994, the Maestro finished in 26th place in the JD Power Survey broadcast by Topgear. This clearly left the model above more recently appeared competitors such as the Volkswagen Golf (52nd), Vauxhall Astra (59th) and the Ford Escort (61st).

In September 1995 production was transferred to Varna, Bulgaria, in complete knock down (CKD) kit form. Around 2,000 vehicles were produced before the company (Rodacar AD) ceased production in April 1996 due to high import costs of the components and little demand for the cars. The majority of the Maestros produced were exported to other countries, including the UK. A small number of these were sold by Apple 2000 Ltd of Bury St Edmunds, and registered on an "N" prefix.

In 1997, Parkway Services of Ledbury, Herefordshire, purchased a batch of 621 Maestro cars and vans in CKD kit form. These had been stored at Cowley, Oxfordshire, since their production in mid-1996, when they became surplus to requirements. The company built up the cars and converted the majority of them to RHD form using up Rover's supply of parts. The National Database for Motoring Insurance has records of models registered between "R" and "51" number plates, meaning the overall period of Maestro availability, new in the United Kingdom, was from 1983 to 2001.

In 1998 the Maestro was relaunched in the UK, by Wheeler International Ltd. Sold by Apple 2000 in Bury St Edmunds, Maestros were imported from Bulgaria and sold in the UK, France & Spain, these were the last factory examples available for sale.  On 10 February 2001 in The Independent's Edition of Your Money, Apple 2000 and the Maestro were Featured on the front page.  In the Motoring section James Ruppert reports "FANCY a brand new Maestro?" you can have one for just £4299 and all remaining cars are appropriately finished in black.

The tooling was then sold to First Automobile Works (FAW) in China, where the Maestro was available to the Chinese motoring market in both hatchback and van models. A new addition to the range was the FAW Lubao CA6410 – a Maestro hatch with a Montego front end. A handful of Chinese-made parts were imported into Britain whilst these cars were in production, which itself ended in 2005.

MG versions

MG Maestro 1600 (1983–1984)
Rushed into production against engineers' advice at the launch in March 1983, the original MG Maestro was under-developed. Its 1.6-litre R-series engine ran roughly, was difficult to start when warm, and its Weber twin carburettors could not be tuned by dealership workshops, who were used to SU carburettors. The R-series model was replaced in July 1984 with the short-lived S-series model which was built until October 1984 when the EFi was launched. Despite the reliability issues, more than 15,000 MG Maestro 1600s were built.

MG Maestro 2.0 EFi (1984–1991)
After a brief interval, the MG Maestro was relaunched in October 1984 with a fuel-injected 2.0-litre O-series engine that gave considerably better performance than its predecessor. Handling and performance were both improved and gave Austin Rover its first serious rival for the Golf GTI and Escort XR3i. It was also mated with a Honda PG1 gearbox for improved gearchange, in preference to the Volkswagen box as supplied to the rest of the range.

MG Maestro Turbo (1989–1991)
With the Rover Group only a few months away, the limited edition (500 + 5 press cars) MG Maestro Turbo (displayed at Birmingham in October 1988 and launched in early 1989) was the final car from ARG. It was faster than the majority of its competitors, but the high performance, Tickford designed bodykit and alloys did little to disguise the fact that it was very much still a Maestro. Sales were slow, as it appeared six years after the Maestro's launch.

Production of the MG Maestro finished in 1991, as Rover had launched GTi versions of the new 200 and 400 models, though the standard Maestro remained in production until 1994.

Decline and "rebirth"
Production of the Maestro, which was already suffering from a decline in sales, was pruned back by autumn 1989 on the launch of the second generation Rover 200, which was aimed at the higher end of the small family car market, with the Maestro being kept on sale as a cheaper alternative with more basic versions available.

The arrival of the Rover 600 in 1993 saw the closure of the Maestro/Montego assembly line, but small-scale production in complete knock down (CKD) kit form continued until 1994, when BMW's takeover of Rover saw production cease almost immediately.

In 1994, Rover established Rodacar, a joint venture with a Bulgarian company to produce Maestros at a new factory in Varna, using CKD kits sent from the UK. Production began in July 1995 and 2,200 cars were assembled before the factory closed in April 1996. The venture failed because of competition from other cars and the Bulgarian government's failure to honour agreements to reduce tariffs on imported parts and buy thousands of Maestros for government departments. Around 1,700 of the Rodacar-made Maestros were exported, including 550 to Uruguay, 400 to Argentina and 200 to North Macedonia.

Two British dealers, Parkway Services in Ledbury and a company called Apple 2000 in Bury St Edmunds, acquired unsold Maestros from Bulgaria and sold them in the UK, converting most of them to right-hand drive. (Please see the 'Later Developments' above for more information.)

Many interior parts from the Maestro/Montego series continued to be used in various Land Rover models well into the late 1990s, for instance the Maestro instrument pack and switchgear were fitted to the Range Rover Classic from the mid-1980s onward, as well as on the Series I Discovery from launch until the 1995 facelift. The Series I Discovery also used the tail lamp cluster from the Maestro van until 1998.

Like most pre-1989 Austin Rover cars, 1.3-litre and 1.6-litre Maestros cannot run on unleaded petrol without the cylinder head being converted (remachining of the cylinder head), or the use of fuel additives. FBHVC (Federation of British Historic Vehicle Clubs) tested and approved lead replacement fuel additives, work out at only a couple of pence a litre. The 1994 cc O-series engine in the MG EFi, 2.0i and Turbo has sufficiently hard exhaust valves and seats.

Muddying the water slightly, contemporary sales literature for the MG Turbo (and the owners' handbook) advised drivers to use only 4* leaded petrol. This was because unleaded petrol was only available with an octane rating of 95 RON. The turbo engine was tuned for the higher 97 RON octane rating of leaded petrol, which improves combustion and reduces the chances of 'pinking' and running lean on boost: both very harmful to turbo engines. Modern high-octane unleaded petrol is a perfectly suitable substitute, but it had yet to become available on forecourts when the cars were current.

Chinese production

In 1997, three years after production of the Maestro ended in the UK, the Chinese tobacco company Etsong acquired the tooling and intellectual property rights to the car. In 2001, the company placed it back into production in two variants; the Etsong Lubao QE6400 Ruby and Etsong Lubao QE6440 Laird, built in a new, specially constructed factory in Qingdao, China. The QE6400 used the hatchback bodyshell of the Maestro, but the frontal styling of the Montego, while the QE6440 was a panel van variant. Both cars used Toyota engines and transmissions.

In 2003, Etsong exited the car-making business and sold the Lubao factory to First Automobile Works, one of China's biggest car-makers. FAW continued to market the hatchback as the Jiefang CA6400UA and the van as the Jiefang CA6440UA. Production for the FAW based cars ended in 2006 then in 2008 the Maestro Van was relaunched as the Yema SQJ6450 by Sichuan Auto Industry Group Company Ltd, who had purchased the tooling from FAW. Yema Auto have since reskinned the car and is currently selling SUV-styled wagon versions as the Yema F99, F10, and most recently the F12 (2012).

Sales
The Maestro sold over 605,000 units, although it failed to match the success of the Ford Escort and Vauxhall Astra. A survey by Auto Express magazine, conducted in August 2006, revealed that the Maestro was Britain's ninth most scrapped car of the previous 30 years, with just 11,574 examples still in circulation and in working order in the United Kingdom.

Despite only going on sale in early March 1983, the Maestro was Britain's sixth best selling car in 1983 with more than 65,000 sales. Its first full year on sale, 1984, brought more than 83,000 sales – which would be the Maestro's best year for sales in any country. As had happened the previous year, it was Britain's sixth best selling car in 1984. However, it had fallen to 10th in 1985; although Austin Rover managed to keep up a strong presence in this sector due to the arrival of the similar sized Rover 200 saloon in June 1984. By 1988, it was merely the 14th best selling car in Britain, dipping further to 19th place in 1989, the year that the second generation Rover 200 was launched. The Maestro was now not only behind the all conquering Ford Escort and Vauxhall Astra (which first outsold it in 1985) in the sales charts, but also behind some foreign competitors including the Volkswagen Golf and Peugeot 309. Sales fell lower still afterwards, as the latest Rover 200 was firmly established as the Rover Group's best seller in this sector, and the Maestro remained on sale as a cheaper alternative until the last ones left the showrooms in the mid-1990s.

Models

Engines
 1983–1993–1275 cc A-series I4, 68 hp (51 kW) at 5800 rpm and 75 lb·ft (102 Nm) at 3500 rpm
 1983–1985–1275 cc A-series I4, 64 hp (48 kW) at 5500 rpm and 73 lb·ft (99 Nm) at 3500 rpm HLE
 July 1984 – October 1984 – 1598 cc S-series I4,  at 6000 rpm MG
 1984–1992–1994 cc O-series I4,  MG EFi and 2.0i
 1988–1990–1994 cc O-series I4,  MG Turbo
 1990–1992–1994 cc Austin/Rover MDi – Perkins Prima NA I4, 
Some prototype versions have a 1.8-litre petrol or Volkswagen's 1.9 diesel engine; these were never used in production.

Trim levels
The Maestro was available in the following trim levels:
 Base (1983–1985)
 L (1983–1990)
 LE (1986–1988)
 HL (1984–1987)
 HLE (1983–1985)
 HLS (1983–1986)
 LX (1990–1993)
 City (1985–1988)
 City X (1985–1988)
 Special (1988–1990)
 Clubman (1990–1994) 
 SL (1988–1990)
 Mayfair (1986–1988)
 Vanden Plas (1983–1988)

References

Sources

External links

 
 

Cars introduced in 1983
1990s cars
Maestro
British Leyland vehicles
Compact cars
Front-wheel-drive vehicles
Hatchbacks
Cars discontinued in 2007